City of Cessnock is a local government area in the Hunter region of New South Wales, Australia. The area under administration is located to the west of Newcastle. The largest population centre and council seat is the city of Cessnock.

The Mayor of the City of Cessnock Council is Cr. Jay Suvaal, a member of Country Labor.

Main towns and villages
The Cessnock City Council area includes
 Cessnock
 Kurri Kurri
 Weston
 Pelaw Main
 Abermain
 Aberdare
 Bellbird
 Kearsley
 Mulbring
 Kitchener
 Paxton
 Millfield
 Ellalong
 Wollombi
 Neath
 Branxton
 Greta

Demographics
Aboriginal and Torres Strait Islander people made up 4.8 per cent of the population, which was nearly double than the national and state averages of 2.5 per cent. The median age of people in the City of Cessnock was 37 years, equal to the national median. Children aged 0 – 14 years made up 21.4 per cent of the population and people aged 65 years and over made up 14.1 per cent of the population. Of people in the area aged 15 years and over, 46.6 per cent were married and 13.2 per cent were either divorced or separated.

When compared with total population growth of Australia for the same periods, being 5.78 per cent and 8.32 per cent respectively, population growth in the City of Cessnock local government area was approximately equal to the national average over the ten-year period. The median weekly income for residents within the City of Cessnock was lower than the national average.

At the 2011 census, the proportion of residents in the City of Cessnock local government area who stated their ancestry as Australian or Anglo-Celtic exceeded 83 per cent of all residents (national average was 65.2 per cent). In excess of 64% of all residents in the City of Cessnock nominated a religious affiliation with Christianity at the 2011 census, which was significantly higher than the national average of 50.2 per cent. Meanwhile, as at the census date, compared to the national average, households in the City of Cessnock local government area had a significantly lower than average proportion (3.1 per cent) where two or more languages are spoken (national average was 20.4 per cent); and a significantly higher proportion (93.0 per cent) where English only was spoken at home (national average was 76.8 per cent).

Council

Current composition and election method
Cessnock City Council is composed of thirteen councillors, including the mayor, for a fixed four-year term of office. The mayor is directly elected while the twelve other councillors are elected proportionally as four separate wards, each electing three councillors. The most recent election was held on 4 December 2021, and the makeup of the council, including the mayor, is as follows:

The current Council, elected in 2021, in order of election by ward, is:

See also

List of local government areas in New South Wales

References

 
Cities in New South Wales
Populated places established in 1906
1906 establishments in Australia